Libera me /Libera me, Domine ("Deliver me, my God") is a Roman Catholic responsory that is sung in the Office of the Dead and at the absolution of the dead.

Libera me may also refer to:

Music
Libera me, WAB 21, 1843 motet by Anton Bruckner
Libera me, WAB 22, 1854 motet by Anton Bruckner
Libera Me (album), 2008 album by DarkSun

Film
Libera me (1993 film), French experimental film directed by Alain Cavalier
Libera Me (2000 film), South Korean action film